Obsession is the second mini-album by South Korean boy band Boyfriend. It was released physically June 9, 2014.

Background and promotion 
In the beginning of May, members Hyunseong, Jeongmin, and Youngmin posted selcas on Twitter with captions hinting to an upcoming comeback. On May 19, 2014, Starship Entertainment uploaded a 30-second trailer to YouTube announcing Boyfriend's next comeback happening in June.

Starting on May 25, 2014, the members opened up their own personal Twitter accounts one by one. Each member tweeted their own teaser images showing the concept for their next comeback. A few days later, a music video trailer was revealed and showed the boys’ new mature image. It also showed that Boyfriend were no longer boys and transformed into men, with member Hyunseong going shirtless and showing his impressive abs.

On June 5, 2014, the music video was uploaded on 1theK's YouTube channel. That same day, Boyfriend had their official comeback performance on Mnet's M!Countdown.

Boyfriend had their album showcase on June 9, 2014 at AX-KOREA. Along with the showcase, the long-awaited album was finally released that same day.

Track listing

Music videos

Charts

Album chart

Sales

References 

2014 EPs
Boyfriend (band) EPs
Starship Entertainment EPs
Kakao M EPs